The Grand Prix de la francophonie is presented annually by the Académie française at the initiative of the Canadian Government to a personality who contributes to the development of the French language throughout the world.

Laureates 
 1986: Georges Schehadé
 1987: Yoichi Maeda
 1988: Jacques Rabemananjara
 1989: Hubert Reeves
 1990: Albert Cossery
 1991: Léon-Joseph Suenens
 1992: Khac Vien Nguyen and Maurice Métral and Stig Strömholm
 1993: Henri Lopes
 1994: Mohammed Dib
 1995: Salah Stétié
 1996: Abdou Diouf
 1997: Abdellatif Berbich
 1998: Jean Starobinski
 1999: Gunnar von Proschwitz
 2000: Giovanni Macchia
 2001: François Cheng
 2002: Bronislaw Geremek
 2003: Édouard J. Maunick
 2004: Albert Memmi
 2005: Jane Conroy
 2006: Roland Mortier
 2007: Élie Barnavi
 2008: Lide Tan
 2009: Thomas W. Gaehtgens
 2010: Jean Métellus
 2011: Abdellatif Laâbi and Dariush Shayegan
 2012: Dariush Shayegan and Michèle Rakotoson
 2013: Qiang Dong and Boualem Sansal
 2014: Georges Banu and Fouad Laroui
 2015: Gabriel Garran and Aminata Sow Fall
 2016: Takeshi Matsumura and Stromae
 2017: François Boustani and Tierno Monénembo
 2018: Kamel Daoud and Michel Tremblay
 2019: Petr Král and Abdeljalil Lahjomri and Jean Pruvost
 2020: Lise Gauvin and Alexandre Najjar
 2021: Frankétienne

External links 
 Grand prix de la francophonie on the site of the Académie française
 Règlement du Grand Prix de la Francophonie
 Grand prix de la francophonie on Babelio
 Grand prix de la francophonie  on Prix littéraires.net
 Grand prix de la francophonie on Écrire en Océanie
  Grand Prix de la Francophonie 2015  on VIVIFAO

Académie Française awards
Awards established in 1986